Ferrous tartrate is a chemical compound and the iron(II) salt of tartaric acid.

Historical uses

Ferrous tartrate has been used as a steel medicine. It was generally prescribed during the 19th and early 20th centuries. It is usually prepared by digesting for 30 days,  tartarated iron in a pint of sherry. It can be difficult to prepare.

Historically, it was used as a stomachic and tonic, at a dose of 2 tbsp.  It was also used to treat anemia, dose 1 to 2 fl. dr.

References 

Drugs acting on the gastrointestinal system and metabolism
Antianemic preparations
Iron(II) compounds
Tartrates